Buddy's Song is the debut album by English singer and actor Chesney Hawkes, released in 1991 by Chrysalis Records. It serves as the soundtrack to the film of the same name and includes the UK number one single "The One and Only". The film's screenwriter Nigel Hinton contributed to the soundtrack by co-writing all but three songs in the UK release of the album. The album and film soundtrack were recorded and mixed entirely at Abbey Road Studios by engineer Gareth Cousins.

The album was released in the United States as The One and Only, as the film was not widely released in the country. For this version, the songs "This Is Me" and "A Crazy World Like This" were replaced with "Waiting for the Night" and a cover of Nik Kershaw's "One World". The title track was featured in the film Doc Hollywood.

Every song on the British release of the album was used in the film except "A Crazy World Like This". Buddy's Song was Hawkes' only album to make the Top 40, peaking at number 18 in the UK Albums Chart. Aside from "The One and Only", "I'm a Man Not a Boy" and "Secrets of the Heart" were also released as singles. In the U.S., "Feel So Alive" was released as the second single, but it failed to chart.

Buddy's Song was included in the 2022 box set The Complete Picture: The Albums 1991–2012, with five bonus tracks.

Track listing

Charts

Weekly charts

Year-end charts

References

External links 
Buddy's Song
 
 
 

The One and Only
 
 
 

1991 debut albums
Chesney Hawkes albums
Albums produced by Alan Shacklock
Chrysalis Records albums